Dainese (pronounced dye-ee-neh-zeh) is an Italian manufacturer of protective equipment and technical gear for dynamic sports, including motorcycling, mountain biking, winter sports and horseriding. Founded in 1972 by Lino Dainese, it has expanded through organic growth and acquisitions, including Italian helmet manufacturer AGV in 2007.

Headquartered in Bahrain, Investcorp acquired a controlling interest in the company in 2014, keeping its founder as a minority shareholder. The company has been led by CEO Cristiano Silei since 2015.

In 2022, The Carlyle Group acquired the stake held by Investcorp and became a majority shareholder in Dainese.

History

Lino Dainese started the company in 1972 when he was 20, making protective motorcycle apparel in Molvena, Vicenza, Italy. The first article of clothing was a pair of motocross pants. The company has been closely associated with motorcycle racing since its foundation, which has informed its product development, focused on safety, performance and ergonomics.

After buying the Italian helmet manufacturer AGV in July 2007, the Dainese Group was acquired for €130 million by Investcorp in 2014, keeping its founder as a minority shareholder and president. Lino Dainese then founded D Airlab, a research center for applying D-air technology for non-sports users, such as construction workers and the elderly.

Since its acquisition in 2014, the group has reported annual revenue growth from €117 million in 2013 to €184.7 million in 2017, during which period the number of employees increased from 609 to 757, as of March 2018. Currently, it maintains its headquarters and its Research and Development and Design Centers in Italy, as well as two regional offices: one in California, USA and one in Hong Kong.

In 2022, The Carlyle Group acquired the stake held by Investcorp and became a majority shareholder in Dainese.

Products 

Dainese Group helmets are branded AGV, while the suits, jackets, shock-absorbing armors and back protectors, pants, boots, gloves and accessories are branded Dainese. These products are made with materials including traditional cowhide, kangaroo skin, aramid, carbon fiber and titanium, and are sold off-the-rack, made-to-measure, or custom made. In 2017 Dainese added the motorcycling fashion clothing brand "Settantadue" ("seventy-two" in Italian).

Dainese has diversified its product range over the years to cover mountain biking, skiing and horse riding, often using the technologies developed for motorcycle racing.

Research 
The Dainese Technology Center (D-Tec) develops protection and apparel-related technologies for the group companies and other applications. The company has registered 118 patents.

Dainese D-air
Dainese D-air is an electronically actuated airbag system developed for motorcyclists. Development began in 1995 and the first working prototype was tested on a race track in 2000. Dainese D-air activated for the first time in an official race when the Italian rider Simone Grotkyj crashed during a 2007 MotoGP practice session at the Valencia circuit. The first Dainese D-air system launched on the market was the racing version in 2011. In 2015, Dainese began selling the Misano 1000, the first standalone jacket for road use incorporating its Dainese D-air Street system, and a version for skiing. There have been significant legal proceedings - widely reported in the press - between Alpinestars and Dainese regarding aspects of their competing motorcycle airbags.

Aerospace
D-Tec hired MIT professor and former NASA Deputy Administrator Dana Newman and space architect Guillermo Trotti to develop the BioSuit, a space suit that uses lines of non-extension on the human body to improve freedom of movement for astronauts during extravehicular activities while maintaining constant pressure. In September 2015, European Space Agency astronaut Andreas Mogensen was the first to test the Dainese SkinSuit in space during his iriss mission to the International Space Station (ISS). This skin-tight garment is designed to be worn inside the ISS, providing head-to-foot loading to counter the lack of gravity and reduce the risk of post-flight injuries to the spinal intervertebral discs. The SkinSuit was worn on the ISS a second time in November 2016, by the French astronaut Thomas Pesquet during the Proxima Mission.

Worker safety garments
In 2017, working in partnership with the Italian multinational energy company ENEL and occupational health professors and doctors at Bologna University and Sant'Orsola-Malpighi Hospital, D Airlab developed the Safety Jacket, an airbag system for protecting workers at risk of accidents from impacts or falling when working at height.

Emirates Team New Zealand
In 2017, Dainese collaborated with Emirates Team New Zealand crew members to design Sea-Guard, the first safety garment developed for yacht races to integrate impact protection and flotation tasks in a single solution.

Dainese Advanced Research Program
Dainese has been working with the Trauma Team at the Niguarda Ca'Granda Hospital, Milan, since 2013 as part of its Dainese Advanced Research Program, which analyzes the effects of motorbike accidents on the human body to improve the design of protective equipment and general rider safety.

Design awards
Dainese has employed designers including Yohji Yamamoto, Adriano Goldschmied, Marc Sadler, Renato Montagner, and Aldo Drudi. The company has won the following design awards.

2001 T-Age suit - ADI Compasso d'Oro International Award

2017 Mugello R suit - RedDot Design Award

2017 Mugello R suit - Good Design Award

2017 Mugello R suit - International Design Excellence Award

2017 Pro Armor protector - RedDot Design Award

2017 Pro Armor protector - Good Design Award

2017 Pro Armor protector - ADI Compasso d'Oro International Award

2018 AWA M1 ski jacket - Red Dot Design Award

2018 AWA M1 ski jacket - Good Design Award

2018 Pro Armor protector - ISPO Award

2018 HP1 RC ski jacket - ISPO Award

Dainese is a member of Altagamma, a trade group of Italian automotive, fashion, recreation, travel, and design companies formed 1992 to advertise and promote high end luxury goods.

Dainese Archivio
The Dainese Archivio (DAR) is a permanent multimedia exhibition in Vicenza opposite the Dainese Headquarters which presents the ideas, people and projects that marked the company's advancements in the fields of safety, sport performance, and design. The collection includes historic Dainese leather racing. Dainese Archivio has educational activities for schools and universities at its DAR Lab.

Racing sponsorship
Dainese has sponsored racing from its earliest years. One of the first was 15-time World Champion Giacomo Agostini, who began racing in Dainese leathers in 1975. Multiple World Championship winner Valentino Rossi is currently among the best-known racers to wear the brand colors. Dainese has sponsored greats like Italian riders Francesco Bagnaia, Stefano Manzi, Andrea Migno and Nicolo Bulega in Moto2 and Moto3 Championships.

Current

Motorcycling
 

MotoGP
 Joan Mir
 Pol Espargaró
 Franco Morbidelli
 Marco Bezzecchi
 Luca Marini
Moto2
 Tony Arbolino
 Celestino Vietti Ramus
 Nicolò Bulega
Moto3
 Niccolò Antonelli
 Gabriel Rodrigo 
 Dennis Foggia 
 Andrea Migno
 Tatsuki Suzuki
WSBK/ Supersport
 Toprak Razgatlioglu
 Gabriele Ruiu
 Sandro Cortese
 Tom Sykes
BSB
 James Hillier
 Ryan Vickers
 Dan Linfoot
 Bradley Ray
Tester MotoGP/ Motard/ 
 Stefan Bradl
 Thomas Chareyre
 Vincent Philippe
Legends
 Guy Martin
 Marco Lucchinelli
 Troy Corser
 Loris Capirossi
 Max Biaggi
 Giacomo Agostini
 Valentino Rossi

Winter sports

Ski
 Stefano Gross
 Roberto Nani
 Manfred Moelgg
 Riccardo Tonetti
 Sofia Goggia
 Nicol Delago
 Manuel Osborne
 Erin Mielzynski
 Matthias Mayer
 Michael Matt
 Vincent Kriechmayr
 Christian Hirschbuehl
 Stephanie Brunner
 Alexander Khoroshilov

Cycling

Mountain biking
 Troy Brosnan
 Mark Wallace
 Kye A'Hern
 Ines Thoma
 Dimitri Tordo
 Florian Nicolai
 Magnus Manson
 Simon Pages
 Simone Pellissero
 Hannes Alber
 Andrea Garella
 Sophie Riva
 Michel Angelini
 Tomaso Ancillotti

Worldwide Stores and Experience Project
Dainese has a network of 70 single-brand protective equipment specialist stores for motorcycling and dynamic sports across Europe, North America and Asia, and also sells direct to the public online through its official e-commerce website dainese.com. A new store concept designed by the Italian architect Renato Montagner was launched in 2017, conceived to also provide a meeting place for dynamic sports enthusiasts to meet and take part in special events and activities.

In 2019, Dainese launched the Dainese Experience project, a series of masterclasses, lessons, long journeys and weekends where customers can learn how to improve their sports performance.

References

External links

 

Sporting goods manufacturers of Italy
Motorcycle safety gear manufacturers
Italian brands
Clothing companies established in 1972
Companies based in Veneto
Motorcycling retailers
Italian companies established in 1972
Motorcycle helmet manufacturers
Compasso d'Oro Award recipients
2022 mergers and acquisitions